The Campus Flirt (a.k.a. The College Flirt) is a lost 1926 American silent comedy film produced by Famous Players-Lasky and distributed by Paramount Pictures. It was directed by Clarence Badger and starred Bebe Daniels. Comedian El Brendel makes his film debut here.

Cast
Bebe Daniels as Patricia Mansfield
James Hall as Denis Adams
El Brendel as Knute Knudson
Charles Paddock as himself
Joan Standing as Harriet Porter
Gilbert Roland as Graham Stearns
Irma Komelia as Mae
Jocelyn Lee as Gwen

References

External links

1926 films
American silent feature films
Films directed by Clarence G. Badger
Famous Players-Lasky films
Paramount Pictures films
1926 comedy films
Silent American comedy films
American black-and-white films
Lost American films
1926 lost films
Lost comedy films
1920s American films
1920s English-language films